Mauritz Christiaan Willem Egmond "Mosey" van Buuren (12 August 1865 – 3 October 1950) was a South African international rugby union player who played as a wing.

Personal
Born in Burgersdorp to Mauritz and Elizabeth (Harris), he attended Diocesan College in Cape Town. He married Edith van der Merwe and after her death in 1901, he married Helena Kotze. Van Buuren died in 1950, in Bedfordview, at the age of 85.

Career
Van Buuren played provincial rugby for Transvaal and made his only international appearance for South Africa in their first ever Test, against Great Britain at the Crusader's Ground, Port Elizabeth.

Test history

See also
List of South Africa national rugby union players – Springbok no. 2

References

1865 births
1950 deaths
People from Burgersdorp
South African people of Dutch descent
South African rugby union players
South Africa international rugby union players
Alumni of Diocesan College, Cape Town
Rugby union players from the Eastern Cape
Rugby union wings
Golden Lions players